Yanni is the stage name of Greek composer and musician Yiánnis Hryssomállis.

Yanni may also refer to:

People:
 Yanni Gourde (born 1991), Canadian ice hockey player
Yanni Hufnagel (born 1982), American college basketball coach
 Yanni Regäsel (born 1996), German footballer
 Zhao Yanni (born 1986), Chinese long-distance steeplechase runner
 Rosanna Yanni (born 1938), stage name of Argentinian film actress Marta Susana Yanni Paxot (born 1938)
  Yanni Yuzon (born 1978), Filipino musician best known as the former guitarist of the band Pupil

Other uses:
 Typhoon Yanni (Heling) (1998), which killed 50 people in South Korea

See also
 Yan Ni (disambiguation)
 Yannis
 Gianni
 Alternate forms for the name John
 Yanny or Laurel, a viral auditory illusion from May 2018